Nicholas Tsoucalas (August 24, 1926 – March 22, 2018) was an American lawyer and United States Judge of the United States Court of International Trade. He is of Greek descent.

Early life, education and career

Judge Tsoucalas was one of five children born to Greek immigrants George and Maria Tsoucalas, on August 24, 1926 in New York City New York. He was educated in the NYC public schools. While in school, he worked at the Le Petit Paris Restaurant, which his father owned for 40 years at Broadway and 145th Street, in Manhattan.

He received a Bachelor of Science degree in 1949 from Kent State University. He received a Bachelor of Laws degree in 1951 from New York Law School. He served in the United States Navy from 1944 to 1946 and again from 1951 to 1952.

He worked in private practice in New York City from 1953 to 1955. He was an Assistant United States Attorney for the Southern District of New York from 1955 to 1959. He worked in private practice in New York City again from 1959 to 1968. He served as a supervisor for the 1960 Census. He served as a Judge of the New York City Criminal Court from 1968 to 1975 and again from 1982 to 1986. He served as an acting Supreme Court Justice in Kings County and Queens County from 1975 to 1982.

Trade Court service

On September 11, 1985, President Reagan nominated Tsoucalas to be a Judge of the United States Court of International Trade, to the seat vacated by Judge Nils Boe. He was confirmed by the United States Senate on June 6, 1986, and received his commission on June 9, 1986. He took senior status on September 30, 1996, and was succeeded by Judge Delissa A. Ridgway. He served in that status until his death on March 22, 2018, from complications of pneumonia at the age of 91.

References

Sources

External links
 Senior Judge Nicholas Tsoucalas Biography on U.S. Court of International Trade website

1926 births
2018 deaths
Assistant United States Attorneys
Deaths from pneumonia in Massachusetts
Judges of the United States Court of International Trade
Kent State University alumni
Lawyers from New York City
Military personnel from New York City
New York Law School alumni
New York Supreme Court Justices
20th-century American judges
American people of Greek descent
20th-century American lawyers
United States federal judges appointed by Ronald Reagan